Art. Lebedev Studio is a design firm in Russia, founded in 1995 by Artemy Lebedev.

The studio creates industrial and graphic design for commercial entities and does not accept projects from private citizens and political or religious organizations. Its motto is "Design will save the world." As of November 2011, it has five principal art directors and over 300 employees. The studio has its headquarters in Moscow, as well as other offices in Kyiv, London and New York City.

Art. Lebedev Studio is owned by the holding company Art. Lebedev Group (ALG), which owns several other design and advertising companies.

History and work 
The studio began with graphic design, then expanded to include interfaces, web design, and most recently industrial design. It has an educational center, a publishing house, a media department, and several software teams. In 2011, Russian advertising research company AdMe called them the leading web studio in Russia.

Website 
The studio's official website is available in Russian and English. The Russian version of the site has technical advice in HTML, XML, XSLT, JavaScript, CSS and other web technologies. The site is typeset as if it were a printed book; for example, punctuation marks and characters which extend to the left (Ф, О, Т, V, т and several others) are rendered several pixels to the left when they are at the beginning of a line.

Design work 
Art. Lebedev Studio produced the design for Russian search engine Yandex, financial group Alfa-Bank, the news sites Lenta.Ru and Gazeta.Ru and Russian promotional websites for Microsoft and Intel.

They designed the Optimus Maximus keyboard, with customizable Organic light-emitting diode displays on every key, and the Just5 Brick mobile phone.  They also won a public vote for the best redesign of the Moscow Metro map, in 2013.

See also 

 Parser, a web scripting language developed by the studio for its web projects and released as free software.

References

External links 
 
 Engadget - Art Lebedev details Optimus Popularis keyboard, puts Mini Six up for pre-order

Design companies of Russia
Branding companies
Web design companies
Companies based in Moscow